Kalabo is an urban centre in Kalabo District, in the Western Province of Zambia. The town is the headquarters of the district with the same name.

Location

The geographical coordinates of Kalabo are:14°59'28.0"S, 22°40'44.0"E (Latitude:-14.991111; Longitude:22.678889).

Overview
It is situated on the bank of the Luanginga River across which a small pontoon ferry connects to a dirt track going north-west to the Angolan border. Zambia's Western Province was formerly known as Barotseland, and Liuwa Plain was the Barotse king's hunting grounds which Lewanika made into a game reserve in the 19th century.

Population
In 2010, the national population census and household survey enumerated the population of Kalabo Town at 2,178 people. In 2020, the town's population was estimated at 7,731 inhabitants.

Transport
Access to Kalabo by road was difficult but now after the completion of the road between Kalabo and Mongu, it is now easier. The section crossing the floodplain is called the Barotse Floodplain Causeway and is counted as an extension of the Lusaka-Mongu Road. The Mongu-Kalabo Road measures  in length. The city of Mongu is the provincial capital of Zambia's Western Province.

Before the construction of the road, Kalabo was usually cut off by road in the rainy season. The dirt tracks across the floodplain from Mongu become flooded, and frequently in poor condition at other times. The tracks go to two ferries across the main channel of the Zambezi, a northern one near Libonda accessed from Mongu via Limulunga, and a southern one at Sandaula accessed via Lealui. In recent years dirt roads on raised earth embankments have been constructed from Mongu to Lealui and from Kalabo to Sandaula. This is part of an ambitious long-term regional plan to provide the first ever major link between the road networks of Zambia and Angola via a paved causeway across the floodplain and a bridge over the Zambezi, replacing the ferry. A paved highway would then be built from Kalabo north-west to the Angolan border and beyond. Although originally intended for completion in 2006, construction has proved more difficult than anticipated and large sections were washed away in floods in 2003/2004, resulting in funding shortfalls.

See also
 Transport in Zambia

References

External links
 Mongu and the Mongu-Kalabo Road in Pictures As of 15 April 2016.

 
Kalabo District
Populated places in Western Province, Zambia